German submarine U-1171 was a Type VIIC/41 U-boat of Nazi Germany's Kriegsmarine during World War II.

She was ordered on 16 July 1942, and was laid down on 5 May 1943, at Danziger Werft AG, Danzig, as yard number 143. She was launched on 23 November 1943, and commissioned under the command of Oberleutnant zur See Otto Heinrich Nachtigall on 22 March 1944.

Design
German Type VIIC/41 submarines were preceded by the heavier Type VIIC submarines. U-1171 had a displacement of  when at the surface and  while submerged. She had two shafts and two  propellers.

U-1171 was fitted with five  torpedo tubes (four fitted at the bow and one at the stern), fourteen torpedoes or 26 TMA or TMB Naval mines, one  SK C/35 naval gun, (220 rounds), one  Flak M42 and two  C/30 anti-aircraft guns. The boat had a complement of between forty-four and fifty-two.

Service history
On 9 May 1945, U-1171 surrendered at Stavanger, Norway, before participating in any war patrols. She was later transferred to Lisahally on 27 May 1945. U-1171 would be spared, for a time, becoming a British N-class submarine, N19, used for testing and then in April 1949, broken up at Sunderland.

See also
 Battle of the Atlantic

References

Bibliography

German Type VIIC/41 submarines
U-boats commissioned in 1944
World War II submarines of Germany
1943 ships
Ships built in Danzig